

Overview 
The University of Kentucky College of Nursing is a nursing school in the University of Kentucky Chandler Medical Center in Lexington, KY. The college is ranked among the top nursing programs nationwide. It is located at 751 Rose Street Lexington, KY 40536-0232. The University of Kentucky College of Nursing has a mission and vision for the people walking through their doors. They want to improve peoples lives through research, education, and health care. There are 1,589 students enrolled in the College of Nursing with many faculty/staff members. They offer a Baccalaureate Degree Program in Nursing, Masters Degree Program in Nursing, Doctor of Nursing Practice Degree Program and the Post-Graduate APRN Certificate Program at the University of Kentucky College of Nursing.

History
Dr. William R. Willard was the founder of the Albert B. Chandler Medical Center and dean of the College of Medicine at UK. Nurses were in short supply so he proposed the idea of the nursing program for high school graduates and for registered nurses. In May of 1960, the college enrolls 35 women who make up the first class and the first class to graduate in 1964. They began to add more and more programs to the college throughout the following years. In 2010, the college celebrated its 50th anniversary. In 2014, Dr. Janie Heath is appointed as the fifth dean and remains the dean until today.

Academic programs

Undergraduate                                           

 Academic Advising
 Traditional BSN
 Accelerated BSN
 RN-BSN
 Internships and Clinical Opportunities
 Information Sessions and Tours

Graduate 

 Master of Science in Nursing
 Doctor of Nursing Practice
 PhD in Nursing
 Postgraduate APRN Certificate
 Tobacco Treatment Specialist Graduate Certificate

Professional Development  

 Continuing Education
 Live Events
 Web Courses
 Courses for College Credit
 State Registered Nurse Aid

References

Nursing
Nursing schools in Kentucky
Educational institutions established in 1960
1960 establishments in Kentucky